Crosio della Valle is a comune (municipality) in the Province of Varese in the Italian region Lombardy, located about  northwest of Milan and about  southwest of Varese.

Crosio della Valle borders the following municipalities: Azzate, Casale Litta, Daverio, Mornago, Sumirago.

Demographic evolution

References

Cities and towns in Lombardy